Plasmodium koreafense is a parasite of the genus Plasmodium.

Like all Plasmodium species P. koreafense has both vertebrate and insect hosts. The vertebrate hosts for this parasite are reptiles.

Description 
The parasite was first described by Perkins and Austin in 2008.

Geographical occurrence 
This species is found in New Guinea.

References 

koreafense